1720 Niels, provisional designation , is a stony asteroid from the inner regions of the asteroid belt, approximately 6.4 kilometers in diameter. It was discovered on 7 February 1935, by German astronomer Karl Reinmuth at Heidelberg Observatory in southern Germany, and named after a grandson of the discoverer.

Orbit and classification 

Niels orbits the Sun in the inner main-belt at a distance of 2.0–2.4 AU once every 3 years and 3 months (1,182 days). Its orbit has an eccentricity of 0.10 and an inclination of 1° with respect to the ecliptic. First observed at Heidelberg in 1927, Niels observation arc begins with its official discovery observation in 1935.

Physical characteristics 

Pan-STARRS classifies this stony asteroid as a LS-type, an intermediate to the rare L-type asteroids.

Rotation period 

A rotational lightcurve of Niels was obtained by astronomer Maurice Clark in December 2005. It gave it a rotation period of 9.976 hours with a brightness variation of 0.15 magnitude. In November 2008, photometric observations by amateur astronomer Pierre Antonini gave another period of 19.2 hours with an amplitude of 0.01. As of 2017, a secure period for Niels has not yet been obtained.

Diameter and albedo 

According to the survey carried out by NASA's Wide-field Infrared Survey Explorer with its subsequent NEOWISE mission, Niels measures 6.394 kilometers in diameter, and its surface has an albedo of 0.227, superseding a preliminary result that gave a slightly larger diameter and lower albedo. The Collaborative Asteroid Lightcurve Link assumes a standard albedo for stony asteroids of 0.20 and calculates a diameter of 8.18 kilometers based on an absolute magnitude of 12.8.

Naming 

The minor planet was named by the discoverer after his grandson, Niels. Reinmuth also named 1719 Jens after one of his grandsons. The official  was published by the Minor Planet Center on 20 February 1976.

References

External links 
 Asteroid Lightcurve Database (LCDB), query form (info )
 Dictionary of Minor Planet Names, Google books
 Asteroids and comets rotation curves, CdR – Observatoire de Genève, Raoul Behrend
 Discovery Circumstances: Numbered Minor Planets (1)-(5000)  – Minor Planet Center
 
 

001720
Discoveries by Karl Wilhelm Reinmuth
Named minor planets
19350207